Guisando (literally "cooking up a stew") is the third studio album of Willie Colón & Héctor Lavoe issued in 1969 by Fania Records. Guisando was the first Colón-Lavoe album in which they shared the credits and the album cover. The track, “I Wish I Had A Watermelon” is a response to the 1962 instrumental "Watermelon Man" by Herbie Hancock.

Track listing
"Guisando" (Willie Colón & Héctor Lavoe) – 4:00
"No Me Den Candela" (Willie Colón) – 7:05
"El Titán" (Willie Colón & Héctor Lavoe) – 5:21
"Oiga Señor" (Willie Colón & Héctor Lavoe) – 3:30
"I Wish I Had a Watermelon" (Willie Colón) – 5:18
"Te Están Buscando" (Mark Dimond) – 7:30
"Se Baila Mejor" (Willie Colón) – 4:20

References

1969 albums
Willie Colón albums
Héctor Lavoe albums